DR3 was a Danish national television channel, produced by the public service broadcaster, DR. The channel was mainly focused on sport, humor, science, music, documentary and fiction. It was launched on 28 January 2013, replacing DR HD.

DR3 programming is directed towards the young and young adult audience, between 15 and 39 years old. The channel airs at least one film each evening, not rarely American comedy, thriller-comedy and action. Series like Vikings, The Knick, Ripper Street and Black Sails has been aired on DR3, and so have X-game sports and even computer games like championships in Counterstrike. The channel doesn't air news. Documentaries are mostly of technical type, for instance "Mayday, Air Disaster" and "Ice Road Truckers".

From 2020, DR3 ceased broadcasting as an open television service, and is instead offered as an online-only service.

From April 5th 2022, DR3 merged with its sister youth-oriented radio station, DR P3.

Logos and identities

Programmes aired on DR3

Original programming
Absurdistan
De uperfekte
Du lyver!
Fuckr med dn hjrne
Generation SoMe!
 - Later moved to DR1 following the success of the show. Remade in the US, UK, Australia, France and Spain as Married at First Sight
Hobby-TV
HomoLesbians
Jeg er ambassadøren - Documentary series showing the life of Rufus Gifford, United States Ambassador to Denmark 2013–2017.
Monte Carlo elsker - A spin-off of the Monte Carlo radio show on DR P3, following the hosts in various situations.
Musik Dok - Kidd Life
Petra dater hele verden
Prinsesser fra blokken
Storm i et glas vand
Thomas Skovs bilprogram
Den utrolige historie om Alexander Blomqvist

Imports 
30 Rock
Family Guy
Girls
Glee
James May's Man Lab
Late Night with Jimmy Fallon
Parks and Recreation
Rookie Blue
Sherlock
Skam
The Graham Norton Show
The Walking Dead
Haven
Vikings
The X Factor

References

External links 
DR3 website

Defunct television channels in Denmark
Television channels and stations established in 2013
Television channels and stations disestablished in 2020